Jan Roman Bytnar, nom de guerre "Rudy" (Ginger) (born 6 May 1921, Kolbuszowa, Poland – died 30 March 1943, Warsaw, Poland) was a Polish scoutmaster, a member of Polish scouting anti-Nazi resistance, and a lieutenant in the Home Army during the Second World War.

Biography
He was the son of Stanisław Bytnar, a teacher and soldier in the Polish Legions in World War I, and Zdzisława Rechulówna. He attended elementary school in Piastów. In 1931 he was accepted to the Stefan Batory Gymnasium in Warsaw, where the Bytnar family moved in the same year. They lived in the Mokotów district.

In 1934, at the age of 13, he joined the Polish Scouting and Guiding Association. In 1938 he attained the highest non-instructor rank, "Scout of the Republic". Shortly before, in 1937, he began attending a lyceum; he graduated in May 1939.

World War II
After the German invasion of Poland in September 1939, Bytnar lived in occupied Warsaw and worked as a glazier and school tutor. In October 1939, together with a group of friends, he joined the short lived left wing Polish People's Independent Action (Polska Ludowa Akcja Niepodległościowa, PLAN), a resistance group. As its member he composed and distributed pamphlets in response to the formation of the General Government by the Nazis. However, the organization was soon infiltrated by the Gestapo and broken up by January 1940. Bytnar left Warsaw and lived with his grandparents in Kolbuszowa in south-eastern Poland, where he also became involved in anti-Nazi resistance. Sometime early in 1940 he joined the Union of Armed Struggle, a precursor organization of the Home Army. In March 1941 he became a member of the Gray Ranks, a paramilitary underground scouting organization which carried out sabotage and diversion against the Germans. In particular, Bytnar and his cell focused on so-called "small sabotage" as part of the Wawer Group.

Arrest, death, and reprisal
He was arrested by the Nazis on 23 March 1943 and rescued three days later by a combat group of the Gray Ranks during the Operation Arsenal on 26 March. He died on 30 March, at the age of 21, from injuries sustained during the interrogation carried out by the Gestapo while in captivity.

The extremely brutal interrogation of Bytnar was conducted by SS Rottenführer Ewald Lange and SS Obersturmführer Herbert Schultz. Both were later assassinated by the Gray Ranks. Schultz was shot dead on 6 May 1943 by Sławomir Maciej Bittner (aka "Maciek") and Eugeniusz Kecher (aka "Kołczan"). Lange was shot dead on 22 May 1943 by Jerzy Zapadko (aka "Dzik").

In literature

See also

 Polish Secret State
 Związek Harcerstwa Polskiego
 Mury
 Battalion Zośka
 Battalion Parasol

References

  Paweł Dubiel, Józef Kozak, Polacy w II wojnie światowej: kim byli, co robili, Oficyna Wydawnicza RYTM, Warszawa, 2003, 
  Stanisław Kopf, Stefan Starba-Bałuk, Armia Krajowa. Kronika fotograficzna, Wydawnictwo Ars Print Production, Warszawa, 1999, 
  Aleksander Kamiński, Stones for the Rampart
  Barbara Wachowicz, Rudy, Alek, Zośka, Oficyna Wydawnicza RYTM, 

1921 births
1943 deaths
People from Kolbuszowa
Home Army officers
Burials at Powązki Military Cemetery
Polish Army officers
Polish Scouts and Guides
Polish torture victims